This article summarizes South Korean football in the 2022 season.

National teams

Results and fixtures

Men's senior

Men's U-23

Men's U-20

Men's U-17

Men's Futsal

Women's Senior

Women's U-20

Women's U-17

Leagues

Men

K League 1

K League 2

K3 League

K4 League

Women

WK-League

Cups

Korean FA Cup

South Korean clubs performance in Asian competitions

Champions League

See also

 Korea Football Association (KFA)

References

External links
 Korea Football Association (KFA) 

Seasons in South Korean football